Magura Sadar is an upazila of Magura District in the Division of Khulna, Bangladesh.

Geography
It has 50,041 households and a total area of 406.5 km2.

Demographics
According to the 1991 Bangladesh census, Magura Sadar had a population of 286925. Males constituted 51.41% of the population, and females 48.59%. The population aged 18 or over was 145,777. Magura Sadar had an average literacy rate of 29.6% (7+ years), compared to the national average of 32.4%.

Administration
Magura Sadar Upazila is divided into Magura Municipality and 13 union parishads: Atharokhada, Baroilpolita, Bogia, Chawlia, Gopalgram, Hazipur, Hazrapur, Jagdal, Kosundi, Kuchiamora, Moghi, Raghab Dair, and Satrijitpur. The union parishads are subdivided into 222 mauzas and 241 villages.

Magura Municipality is subdivided into 9 wards and 61 mahallas.

Education

There are 12 colleges in the upazila: Aisa Women's College, Amoresh Bosu Degree Mohabidaylaya, Banassree Rabindra Smarani College Krishnabila (Tangakhali), Buzruk Sree Kundi College, Dakhin Nowapara Sammilani College, Government Hossain Shahid Suhrawardi College, Hazipur Sammilani College, Jagdal Sammiloni College, Magura Adarsha Degree College Magura, Magura Government Mohila College, Nazir Ahamad Degree Mahavidaloy, and Shatrujitpur College.

According to Banglapedia, Magura Government Boys' High School, founded in 1854, and Hazipur Secondary School (1914) are notable secondary schools.

Notable residents
 Lutfunnahar Helen, martyred intellectual, was born in Magura in 1947 and taught at Magura Government Girls High School.

See also
 Upazilas of Bangladesh
 Districts of Bangladesh
 Divisions of Bangladesh

References

Upazilas of Magura District
Magura District
Khulna Division